Williams Arena at Minges Coliseum is a multi-purpose arena in Greenville, North Carolina, US. The arena opened in 1968. It is home to the East Carolina University Pirates men's and women's basketball teams and women's volleyball team. The facility underwent a complete renovation prior to the 1994–95 season and seats 8,000 people. The building was named for the Minges and Williams families in honor of their longstanding support of the University.

See also
 List of NCAA Division I basketball arenas

References

Basketball venues in North Carolina
College basketball venues in the United States
Indoor arenas in North Carolina
Sports venues in North Carolina
East Carolina Pirates basketball
Sports venues in Pitt County, North Carolina
1968 establishments in North Carolina
Sports venues completed in 1968
College volleyball venues in the United States